Parliamentary elections were held in Nigeria on 9 April 2011.

Dates
The election was originally scheduled to be held on 2 April. However it was later postponed to 4 April on the originally scheduled day of the election itself as voters turned up in the morning to see ballots had not yet arrived. The next day Attahiru Jega, the head of the electoral commission, said that "The commission weighed all the options and considered the wide-ranging counsel of Nigerians and decided to reschedule all the elections as follows: Saturday, April 9, senate and house of representatives elections; Saturday, April 16, presidential elections; Tuesday, April 26, state houses of assembly and governorship elections. Some parties have said they won't take part. Without political parties there was no election so INEC has to listen to their comments."

This comes after Jega was allocated US$570m budget in August 2010 to overhaul voter lists and acquire more ballot boxes.

Contesting parties
The incumbent People's Democratic Party ran against the Action Congress of Nigeria and the Congress for Progressive Change, amongst others. The CPC appeared to make inroads in the north.

Campaign
The people living in the oil-producing Niger Delta sought political representation that would be strong enough to be able to deal with a cleanup of the polluted parts of their region.

In Kano State, traditional voting along sectarian lines was seen to change in favour of cross-voting for candidates who seemed most capable of delivering on promises of alleviating poverty.

Conduct
In December 2010, bombs went off in Yenegoa, Bayelsa State during a gubernatorial campaign rally. There were also bombings and shooting in the north blamed on Boko Haram. Politicians and police said that the campaign of violence aimed to disrupt the election. Again on 3 March assailants in Abuja attacked a People's Democratic Party rally with a bomb killing three and wounding 21. The police said that the attack occurred just after the state governor Mu'azu Babangida Aliyu made an address and left.

The day before the election a bomb went off by the National Electoral Commission offices in Suleja outside the capital Abuja killing at least eight people. The bombing followed a shooting in Borno state that killed four people, including a member of the incumbent Peoples' Democratic Party. On the day of the election itself another bomb went off in Maiduguri. Yushua Shuaib of the National Emergency Management Agency said there was a possibility of casualties. At least two were later reported to have died. During the campaigning season up to a 100 people were reported to have died in bombings and shootings.

Results
Turnout was reported to be low in the commercial capital of Lagos. Voting in the north continued the next day as there was a high turnout.

Preliminary results indicated that the incumbent People's Democratic Party would lose their parliamentary strength.

The Action Congress of Nigeria made gains in the southwest, where Lagos is located and the Congress for Progressive Change made gains in the north.

High-profile losses included the PDP's Dimeji Bankole, the speaker of the House of Representatives, and former president Olusegun Obasanjo's daughter in the Senate. However the PDP still had just over half of the one-fifth of the seats declared at the time.

Polling in 15 Senatorial districts and 48 federal constituencies were delayed again until 26 April 2011 due to logistical problems.

Senate

House of Representatives

Results by state
Bayelsa State
Federal Capital Territory
Kwara State
Nasarawa State
Taraba State

See also
Nigerian Senators of the 7th National Assembly

References

Further reading
Ayoade, John A., and Adeoye A. Akinsanya, eds. Nigeria's Critical Election, 2011 (Lexington Books; 2012)

Parliamentary elections in Nigeria
parliamentary election
Election and referendum articles with incomplete results
Parl